Examples of areas where Cambodians encounter corrupt practices in their everyday lives include obtaining medical services, dealing with alleged traffic violations, and pursuing fair court verdicts. Companies are urged to be aware when dealing with extensive red tape when obtaining licenses and permits, especially construction related permits, and that the demand for and supply of bribes are commonplace in this process. The 2010 Anti-Corruption Law provides no protection to whistleblowers, and whistleblowers can be jailed for up to 6 months if they report corruption that cannot be proven.

Extent 
Human trafficking and sex trafficking in Cambodia are significant problems. The anti-human-trafficking unit in Phnom Penh is the epitome of that. Bribes to arrest innocent people have been accepted and sexual favors from prostitutes have been demanded and recorded by NGOs. 

Transparency International's 2017 Corruption Perception Index ranks the country 161st place out of 180 countries. Transparency International's 2021 Corruption Perception Index ranks the country in 157th place out of 180 countries.

Anti-corruption efforts 
In January 2012, the National Assembly passed Cambodia's first law on public procurement in a bid to fight endemic corruption in the public sector. In 2010, the government established the National Arbitration Center, Cambodia's first alternative dispute resolution mechanism, to enable companies to resolve commercial disputes more quickly and inexpensively than through the court system. Official operation of the center was delayed until early 2012.

The Cambodian government passed the Anti-Corruption Law in March 2010. Under the new law, any official found guilty of corruption can face up to 15 years in prison. Under Cambodia's Anti-Corruption Law, people who resort to facilitation payments to obtain government services will now face harsh penalties; this also applies to government officials on the receiving end.

See also 
 Crime in Cambodia

References

External links
Cambodia Corruption Profile from the Business Anti-Corruption Portal

Cambodia
Cambodia
Crime in Cambodia by type
Politics of Cambodia
Society of Cambodia